Meguro, Tokyo held a mayoral election on April 20, 2008. Incumbent Eiji Aoki won.

Candidates 

 Eiji Aoki, 53, incumbent mayor, supported by the Liberal Democratic Party, Komeito, Democratic Party and the Social Democratic Party
 Mariko Nozawa, 61, former ward assemblywoman supported by the Japanese Communist Party.
 Miyoko Ankyu, 73, independent candidate working as a nurse.

Issues 

Both opposition candidates published manifestos focused on welfare, Miyoko Ankyu promised expanded health care schemes for elderly while Mariko Nozawa made poverty reduction a prioritized issue.

Results

References 

Local elections in Japan
Meguro
2008 elections in Japan
Mayoral elections in Japan
April 2008 events in Japan
2008 in Tokyo